George Tabori ( György Tábori; 24 May 1914 – 23 July 2007) was a Hungarian writer and theatre director.

Life and career
Tabori was born in Budapest as György Tábori, a son of Kornél and Elsa Tábori. His father Kornél (Cornelius) was murdered in Auschwitz in 1944, but his mother and his brother Paul Tabori (writer and psychical researcher), managed to escape the Nazis. As a young man, Tabori travelled to Berlin but was forced to leave Nazi Germany in 1935 because of his Jewish background. He first went to London, where he worked for the BBC and received British citizenship. In 1947 he emigrated to the United States, where he became a translator (mainly of works by Bertolt Brecht and Max Frisch) and a screenwriter including Alfred Hitchcock's movie I Confess (1953).

His first novel, Beneath The Stone, was published in America in 1945. In the late 1960s, Tabori brought his own and the work of Brecht to many colleges and universities. At the University of Pennsylvania he taught classes in dramatic writing which resulted in Werner Liepolt's The Young Master Dante and Ron Cowen's Summertree. His play The Niggerlovers debuted in 1967 starring Morgan Freeman and Stacy Keach. Two of Tabori's plays in English -- The Cannibals and Pinkville—were produced by Wynn Handman at the American Place Theatre in New York City from 1968 through 1970. His play The Prince was filmed by John Boorman as Leo the Last (1970) with Marcello Mastroianni and Billie Whitelaw; the film won the Director's Prize at the Cannes Film Festival in that year.

During his period in America, Tabori married Viveca Lindfors.  In addition to his own child, Lena, with Lindfors, Tabori adopted Lindfors' two sons (from her marriage to film director Don Siegel), John and Kristoffer. Kristoffer later became an actor and Lena a publisher.

In 1971, Tabori moved to Germany, where his new emphasis was theater work, and mainly worked in Berlin, Munich, and Vienna. His 1991 Goldberg Variations is a satirical farce based on Biblical stories which end in disaster.

He died in Berlin, aged 93.

Screenplays
 Thunder in the East (1951, based on the novel The Rage of the Vulture by Alan Moorehead)
 I Confess (1953, based on the play Nos deux consciences by Paul Anthelme Bourde)
 The Young Lovers (1954)
 The Journey (1959)
 No Exit (1962, based on the play No Exit by Jean-Paul Sartre)
 Secret Ceremony (1968, based on the short story Ceremonia secreta by Marco Denevi)
 Parades (1972)

Film adaptations
Crisis (1950, based on the short story The Doubters)
Leo the Last (1970, based on the play The Prince)
 (1995, based on an autobiographical story)
Mein Kampf (2009, based on the play Mein Kampf)

Awards and honors
1983 Mülheimer Dramatikerpreis
1990 Mülheimer Dramatikerpreis
2001 Kassel Literary Prize
2001 Nestroy Theatre Prize for Lifetime achievement

Marriages
Hannah Freund (1942–1954; divorced)
Viveca Lindfors (1954–1972; divorced); 1 stepson (Kristoffer Tabori)
Ursula Grützmacher-Tabori (1976–1984; divorced)
Ursula Höpfner (1985–2007; his death)

References

Further reading
 
Russell, Susan. Masters thesis: BEYOND ALL TEARS: THE HOLOCAUST DRAMA OF GEORGE TABORI (University of Wisconsin-Madison, 1989)
 
 Martin Kagel, "Ritual Remembrance: George Tabori's The Cannibals in Transnational Perspective," in Martinson, Steven D. / Schulz, Renate A. (eds./Hrsg.), Transcultural German Studies / Deutsch als Fremdsprache: Building Bridges / Brücken bauen (Bern etc., Peter Lang, 2008) (Jahrbuch für Internationale Germanistik, Reihe A: Kongressberichte, 94).

External links

 Obituary in The Times, 2 October 2007
 A list of plays in English  
 A complete bibliography 
 
  (archive)
 George Tabori at the University of Wisconsin's Actors Studio audio collection

1914 births
2007 deaths
Actors Studio alumni
Georg Büchner Prize winners
Hollywood blacklist
Hungarian emigrants to Germany
Hungarian emigrants to the United States
Hungarian Jews
American people of Hungarian-Jewish descent
Hungarian theatre directors
Writers from Budapest
Best British Screenplay BAFTA Award winners
Officers Crosses of the Order of Merit of the Federal Republic of Germany
Burials at the Dorotheenstadt Cemetery
20th-century screenwriters